Henry Wilmot may refer to:

Henry Wilmot, 1st Earl of Rochester (1612–1658)
Sir Henry Wilmot, 4th Baronet (1801–1872)
Sir Henry Wilmot, 5th Baronet (1831–1901), English recipient of the Victoria Cross
Sir Henry Wilmot, 9th Baronet (born 1967) 
Henry Wilmot (politician) (1826–1888), Ontario MPP